

2010

December
Protests arose in Tunisia following Mohamed Bouazizi's self-immolation.

On 29 December, protests begin in Algeria

2011

January
Protests arose in Oman, Yemen, Jordan, Egypt, Syria, & Morocco.

The government was overthrown in Tunisia on 14 January 2011.

On 25 January 2011, thousands of protesters in Egypt gathered in Tahrir Square, in Cairo. They demanded the resignation of President Hosni Mubarak.

February
On 1 February, King Abdullah II of Jordan dismisses Prime Minister Samir Rifai and his cabinet.

On 3 February, the President of Algeria Abdelaziz Bouteflika promised to lift the 19-year-old state of emergency.

On 11 February, the President of Egypt Hosni Mubarak resigned, and transferred his powers to the Supreme Council of the Armed Forces.

On 12 February, protests erupt in Iraq

On 14 February, the protests in Bahrain started, and were initially aimed at achieving greater political freedom and respect for human rights; they were not intended to directly threaten the monarchy.

On 15 February protests broke out against Muammar Gaddafi's regime in Benghazi, Libya, starting the uprising that would soon turn into the Libyan Civil War.

On 17 February, the police raid the Pearl Roundabout in Manama, where protesters were protesting, four protesters were killed.

On 19 February, protests erupt in Kuwait.

On 26 February, Sultan Qaboos bin Said al Said of Oman makes some economic concessions.

March
On 3 March, the former Prime Minister of Egypt, Ahmed Shafik, also resigned, after protests.

On 13 March, Sultan Qaboos promises to grant lawmaking powers to Oman's elected legislature.

On 14 March, GCC forces (composed mainly of Saudi and UAE troops) were requested by the government of Bahrain and they occupied the country.

On 15 March, uprisings began in Syria.

On 18 March, the government of Bahrain tore down Pearl Roundabout monument.

April
On April, King Abdullah of Jordan creates the Royal Committee to Review the Constitution with directions to review the Constitution in accordance with calls for reform.

June
On 3 June, the President of Yemen Ali Abdullah Saleh was injured in a failed assassination attempt. He temporarily made his Vice President, Abd Rabbuh Mansur Al-Hadi, the Acting President of the nation.

On June, the Constitutional Court of Kuwait declared that the February 2012 National Assembly election was "illegal" and reinstated the previous pro-government parliament.

On 26 June, thousands of Kuwaitis rally in Al-Erada Square to protest against a court ruling that dissolved the opposition-dominated parliament.

July
On 1 July, a constitutional referendum is held in Morocco.

August
Between 20 and 28 August, the Battle of Tripoli, occurred, in Libya. Rebel forces captured, and effectively gained control of, the capital city of Tripoli, therefore practically overthrowing the government of the dictator Muammar Gaddafi.

On 27 August, around 3,000 people, mainly men in traditional Kuwaiti dress, gathered opposite parliament at Al-Erada Square to protest changes to the electoral law.

September
On 30 September, Abdullah II approves changes to all 42 articles of the Constitution.

October
On 9 and 10 October, Coptic Christians in Egypt protested against the destruction of a church. The Army responded by attacking the protesters with tanks, killing many.

On 20 October, Muammar Gaddafi was captured and killed, by rebels, in the city of Sirte. On 23 October, the National Transitional Council (NTC) officially declared an end to the 2011 Libyan Civil War.

On 24 October, Abdullah II dismisses Prime Minister Marouf al-Bakhit and his cabinet.

November
On 19 November, Muammar Gaddafi's son, Saif al-Islam Gaddafi, was finally captured, after hiding in Nigeria.

Between 19 and 21 November, many people once again protested in Cairo's Tahrir Square, demanding that the SCAF speed up the transition to a more civilian government. Clashes between protesters and soldiers then proceeded to happen, and many people were injured or killed.

On 23 November, the Bahrain Independent Commission of Inquiry released its report on its investigation of the events, finding that the government had systematically tortured prisoners and committed other human rights violations. It also rejected the government's claims that the protests were instigated by Iran.

On 28 November, Kuwait Prime Minister Nasser Al-Sabah resigns.

December
On 20 December, many women protested in Egypt against human rights violations.

2012

January
On 10 January, the President of Syria, Bashar al-Assad, gave a speech, in which he blamed the uprising on foreigners, and said that it would require the co-operation of all Syrians, in order to stop the rebels.

On 24 January, the Egyptian Field Marshal and leader of the military, Mohamed Hussein Tantawi, announced that the decades-old state of emergency would be partially lifted, the following day.

February
Starting on 3 February, the Syrian government began an attack on the city of Homs.

On 27 February, the President of Yemen, Ali Abdullah Saleh, officially resigned, and then transferred his powers to his Vice President, Abd Rabbuh Mansur Al-Hadi.

April
On 20 April, many people once again protested in Cairo's Tahrir Square, demanding a quicker transfer of power to a new President.

May
On 2 May, as the protests continue, Awn Al-Khasawneh resigned, and the King appoints Fayez Tarawneh as the new Prime Minister of Jordan.

On 23 & 24 May, the Egyptian people voted in the first round of a presidential election. Ahmed Shafik and Mohammed Morsi were the two winners, of this election.

On 25 May, the Syrian government carried out a massacre in Houla, killing 108 people.

June
On 2 June, the former Egyptian president Hosni Mubarak was sentenced to life in prison, by an Egyptian court.

On 13 June, the former Tunisian president Zine El Abidine Ben Ali was sentenced to prison, by a Tunisian court.

On 16 & 17 June, the Egyptian people voted in the 2nd round of a presidential run-off election, in which Mohammed Morsi received the most votes.

On 24 June 2012, Egypt's election commission announced that Muslim Brotherhood candidate Mohammed Morsi had won Egypt's presidential runoff. Morsi won by a narrow margin over Ahmed Shafiq, the last prime minister under deposed leader Hosni Mubarak. The commission said Morsi took 51.7 percent of the vote versus 48.3 for Shafiq.

July
On 12 July, the Syrian army carried out a massacre in the Village of Tremseh. Up to 225 people were killed.

On 15 July, the International Committee of the Red Cross officially declared that the Syrian uprising was now a civil war.

On 18 July, a bombing in Damascus killed many members of President Bashar al-Assad's inner circle, including his brother-in-law, Asef Shawkat.

On 19 July, the former Vice President of Egypt, Omar Suleiman, died of a heart attack at a hospital in Cleveland, Ohio, in the United States

Starting on 27 July, government forces and rebels began fighting a battle to capture Syria's largest city, Aleppo. The UN reports that over 200,000 Syrian refugees have now fled the country, ever since the fighting began.

September
In late September, the Free Syrian Army moved its command headquarters from southern Turkey into rebel-controlled areas of northern Syria.

September 11, 2012, Islamic militants attacked the American diplomatic mission at Benghazi, in Libya, killing U.S. Ambassador J. Christopher Stevens and Sean Smith, U.S. Foreign Service Information Management Officer.

October
On 9 October, the Free Syrian Army seized control of Maarat al-Numan, a strategic town in Idlib Governorate on the highway linking Damascus with Aleppo. By 18 October, the FSA had captured the suburb of Douma, the biggest suburb of Damascus.

On 10 October, Abdullah dissolves the parliament for new early elections, and appoints Abdullah Ensour as the new Prime Minister.

On 19 October, Wissam al-Hassan, a brigadier general of the Lebanese Internal Security Forces (ISF), died along with several others in the 2012 Beirut bombing.

November
On 22 November 2012 Egyptian protests started, with hundreds of thousands of protesters demonstrating against Egyptian president Mohammed Morsi, after he granted himself unlimited powers to “protect” the nation, and the power to legislate without judicial oversight or review of his acts.

2013

January
On 25 January, protests against Mohamed Morsi developed all over Egypt on the second anniversary of the 2011 revolution, including in Tahrir Square, where thousands of protesters gathered. At least 6 civilians and 1 police officer were shot dead in the Egyptian city of Suez, while 456 others were injured nationwide.

February
In early February, Syrian rebels began an offensive on Damascus. On 12 February 2013, the United Nations stated that the death toll of the Syrian civil war had exceeded 70,000.

March
On March 6, Syrian rebels captured Ar-Raqqah, the first major city to be under rebel control in the Syrian civil war. Meanwhile, the Syrian National Coalition was granted Syria's membership in the Arab League.

April
On 24 April, the minaret of the Great Mosque of Aleppo, Syria, built in 1090, was destroyed during an exchange of heavy weapons fire between government forces and rebels.

June
On June 5, Syrian government forces retook the strategic town of Al-Qusayr.

July
Mohamed Morsi is deposed as President of Egypt in a coup d'état, followed by clashes between security forces and protestors.

August
On 14 August, Egyptian security forces under the command of interim president Adly Mansour raided two camps of protesters in Cairo.

In the Ghouta chemical attack on 21 August 2013, several areas that were disputed or controlled by the Syrian opposition were struck by rockets containing the chemical agent sarin. Estimates of the death toll range from 'at least 281' to 1,729 fatalities.

December
On 30 December, the Iraqi Civil War officially begins.

2014

January
A conflict between the Syrian opposition and the Islamic State of Iraq and the Levant erupts.

February
Egyptian government resigns, paving way for military chief Sisi to run for president.

May
Syrian rebels withdraw from the siege of Homs.

September
On 8 September, Haider al-Abadi is elected Prime Minister of Iraq after elections.

By country or region

 Egyptian Crisis (2011–2014)
 Timeline of the Bahraini uprising of 2011
 Timeline of the Syrian Civil War
 Timeline of the Yemeni Revolution
 Timeline of the 2011 Libyan Civil War
 Timeline of the 2011–13 Saudi Arabian protests

See also
 Arab Spring

References